Sonar 2087 is a towed array sonar designed and manufactured by Thales Underwater Systems at sites in the UK (Cheadle Heath in Stockport, Templecombe in Somerset and Crawley in West Sussex) and in France (Brest). Sonar 2087 replaces the older Sonar 2031 in the Royal Navy and equips eight Type 23 frigates. The system is also expected to equip the Royal Navy's future Type 26 Global Combat Ship starting around 2020.

It is a Low Frequency Active Sonar (LFAS) and consists of both active and passive sonar arrays. Thales describes the system as "a towed-array that enables Type 23 frigates to hunt the latest submarines at considerable distances and locate them beyond the range at which they [submarines] can launch an attack."

During Exercise Auriga in 2010, HMS Sutherland's capability equipped with Sonar 2087 was described as "world-beating" by the Sutherland's commanding officer. American, British, Canadian and French warships took part in the exercise, including the French nuclear submarine Perle.

A new programme named Spearhead was launched in October 2022 to perform rapid development on Sonar 2087 to add new active and passive variable depth sonar capability to the existing system on Type 23 frigates.

See also
 Sonar
 Surveillance Towed Array Sensor System

References

Sonar 2087
Military sonar equipment of the United Kingdom
United Kingdom defence procurement